The play-off round of the 2023 AFC Asian Cup qualification was played between 7 and 12 October 2021. It was originally scheduled for 3–8 September, 13 October and 17 November 2020, but the AFC changed the dates due to the COVID-19 pandemic in Asia.

Format
A total of four teams (the four lowest fifth-placed teams of the Asian Cup qualifying second round) competed in the play-off round. The two play-off winners joined the 22 teams which advanced directly from the Asian Cup qualifying second round to the third round, to compete for the final 11 slots in the 2023 AFC Asian Cup.

The play-off round was originally supposed to be consisted of 12 teams playing for 2 rounds. Following both Qatar and China's qualifications for the final tournament, the number was reduced from 12 to 4. The play-off losers would have joined the six teams which lost in the Asian Cup qualifying first round. They were to compete for the 2020 AFC Solidarity Cup, which was cancelled.

Qualified teams

Draw 
The draw for the play-off round was held on 24 June 2021, 15:00 MYT (UTC+8), at the AFC House in Kuala Lumpur, Malaysia. The four teams (Cambodia, Chinese Taipei, Guam, and Indonesia) were drawn into two pairings. The team drawn first in each pairing hosted the first leg, and the team drawn second in each pairing hosted the second leg.

Matches
Each tie was played on a home-and-away two-legged basis. The away goals rule, extra time (away goals do not apply in extra time) and penalty shoot-out would have been used to decide the winner if necessary (Regulations Article 8.4).

The first leg was played on 7 and 9 October, and the return leg was played on 11 and 12 October 2021. Due to the COVID-19 pandemic, these fixtures were held in neutral grounds, with Bahrain and Thailand hosting these occasions.

Summary

Details

Cambodia won 3–1 on aggregate.

Indonesia won 5–1 on aggregate.

Goalscorers

References

External links
, the-AFC.com

QualP
P
October 2021 sports events in Asia